The Department of Politics and International Relations (DPIR) is a department of the Social Sciences Division of the University of Oxford in England.

History
The department was established in 2000. It has been said that a "distinctive institutional feature of Oxford over the [20th] century ... (and ... a feature considered detrimental by some authors) was its remarkably late 'departmentalization' of political science and international relations."
 The Oxford Philosophy, politics and economics (PPE) degree had been offered since 1920, and in 1934 the sub-faculty of Politics was established within the faculty of social sciences.

Notable alumni
Notable people who have been awarded the PPE degree at Oxford include former UK prime ministers David Cameron, Edward Heath and Harold Wilson; non-UK prime ministers Benazir Bhutto, Bob Hawke, Pedro Pablo Kuczynski and Abhisit Vejjajiva; Burmese leader Aung San Suu Kyi;  media personalities David Dimbleby, Robert Peston and Will Self. Bill Clinton studied politics at Oxford but did not take a degree.

Rankings
, the Times Higher Education World University Rankings ranks Oxford first for politics and international studies (including development studies) overall, and for research, and fifth for teaching.

The Academic Ranking of World Universities, ranks Oxford as ninth in a worldwide listing of universities for the study of political sciences; the only higher-ranked UK institution was the London School of Economics.

, Oxford is ranked in first place in the Complete University Guide listing for the study of politics in British universities.

References

External links

Politics
Educational institutions established in 2000
2000 establishments in England
Oxford